Kurzeme District is one of six administrative districts of Riga, the capital of Latvia.

Kurzeme is the Latvian name for Courland, a historical and cultural region of Latvia.

Administrative divisions of Riga